The Professional Footballers' Association Young Player of the Year (often called the PFA Young Player of the Year, or simply the Young Player of the Year) is an annual award given to the young player who is adjudged to have been the best of the season in English football.  As of 2021, players must have been aged 21 or under as of 1 July immediately preceding the start of the season; in the past the age limit has been 23, which led to criticism in the media over whether a player who was 24 years old at the end of the season could really be considered "young" in footballing terms. The award has been presented since the 1973–74 season and the winner is chosen by a vote amongst the members of the players' trade union, the Professional Footballers' Association (PFA). The first winner of the award was Ipswich Town defender Kevin Beattie. The current holder is Phil Foden, who won the award on 9 June 2022.

Although the award is open to players at all levels, all winners to date have played in the highest division of the English football league system. In 2018 Ryan Sessegnon of Fulham became the first player from outside the top division of English football to be nominated for the award.  As of 2022, only Ryan Giggs, Robbie Fowler, Wayne Rooney, Dele Alli and Phil Foden have won the award on more than one occasion. Only seven players from outside the United Kingdom have won the trophy, compared with fifteen winners of the main PFA Players' Player of the Year award.  Although they have their own dedicated award, players aged 23 or under at the start of the season remain eligible to win the Players' Player of the Year award, and on three occasions the same player has won both awards for a season.  

A shortlist of nominees is published in April and the winner of the award, along with the winners of the PFA's other annual awards, is announced at a gala event in London. The players themselves consider the award to be highly prestigious, because the winner is chosen by his fellow professionals.

Winners
The award has been presented on 49 occasions as of 2022, to 44 players. The table also indicates where the winning player also won one or more of the other major "player of the year" awards in English football, namely the PFA Players' Player of the Year award (PPY), the Football Writers' Association's Footballer of the Year award (FWA), the Premier League Player of the Season award (PPS), the Premier League Young Player of the Season award (PYPS), and the PFA Fans' Player of the Year award (FPY).

Breakdown of winners

By country

By club

References

External links
The official website of the Professional Footballers' Association

English football trophies and awards
Association football young player of the year awards
Awards established in 1974
Youth football in England
Rookie player awards